The following is the list of squads for each of the 12 teams competing in the EuroBasket 1983, held in France between 26 May and 4 June 1983. Each team selected a squad of 12 players for the tournament.

Group A

France

Greece

Italy

Spain

Sweden

Yugoslavia

Group B

Czechoslovakia

Israel

Netherlands

Poland

Soviet Union

West Germany

References
 1983 European Championship for Men, FIBA.com.
 European Championship 1983 - National Squads, LinguaSport.com.

1983